Steven James McClain (born August 15, 1962) is an assistant basketball coach at Texas. He was most recently head coach at the University of Illinois Chicago. Prior to UIC, he had spent five seasons on the staff of Tom Crean at Indiana Hoosiers men's basketball team.

Coaching career

Wyoming 
McClain was the head basketball coach at Wyoming from 1998 to 2006. In four out of his 9 seasons, Wyoming had made it to either the NCAA tournament, or the NIT tournament. His overall record at Wyoming was 157–115. However, after a disappointing 2006 campaign where he went 17–15, with no NIT berth, he was fired. In the 2002 NCAA tournament, Wyoming made it to the second round, which was their best finish in a long time. He was named the MWC coach of the year that season.

Steve McClain was known for his very animated and intense coaching style during games.

His teams have won two regular season conference championships. In six out of the 8 seasons he has coached in the MWC, at least one of his players has received First team All MWC honors. From 2000 to 2002, the Cowboys won at least 20 games in all three of their seasons, marking the first time that happened in two decades.

UIC 
McClain parted ways with UIC after five seasons on March 13, 2020 after a 18–17 season that fell 1 win short of an NCAA tournament bid.

Assistant coach 
As an assistant at Colorado, McClain served as acting head coach during the absence of head coach Jeff Bzdelik for a portion of the 2009–10 season.  He helped lead the Buffaloes to a 15–16 record, with seven of those losses coming by six points or less.

On April 22, 2020, Georgia announced the hiring of McClain as an assistant coach, reuniting him with Tom Crean who was the head coach at Indiana where McClain was the assistant for the 2010–15 seasons.

Head coaching record

References

1962 births
Living people
Basketball coaches from Iowa
Chadron State College alumni
Chadron State Eagles men's basketball coaches
Colorado Buffaloes men's basketball coaches
College men's basketball head coaches in the United States
Hutchinson Blue Dragons men's basketball coaches
Independence Pirates men's basketball coaches
Indiana Hoosiers men's basketball coaches
Place of birth missing (living people)
TCU Horned Frogs men's basketball coaches
UIC Flames men's basketball coaches
Wyoming Cowboys basketball coaches